Kjell-Åke Nilsson is a Swedish former footballer who played as a forward.

References

Living people
Association football forwards
Swedish footballers
Allsvenskan players
Malmö FF players
Year of birth missing (living people)